Sir Clement Throckmorton (c. 1630 – 10 November 1663) was an English politician who sat in the House of Commons  variously between 1656 and 1663.

Throckmorton was the son of Sir Clement Throckmorton of Haseley Warwickshire, and his wife Lettice Fisher, daughter of Sir Clement Fisher of Packington, Warwickshire.

In 1656, Throckmorton was elected Member of Parliament for Warwick in the Second Protectorate Parliament.

In 1660, Throckmorton was elected MP for Warwick in the Convention Parliament. He was knighted on 11 September 1660. In 1661 he was re-elected MP for Warwick for the Cavalier Parliament and sat until his death

References

1630 births
1663 deaths
English MPs 1656–1658
English MPs 1660
English MPs 1661–1679
Clement